Jana Novotná was the defending champion, but lost in second round to Miriam Oremans.

Mary Joe Fernández won the title by defeating Amanda Coetzer 6–4, 7–5 in the final.

Seeds
The first four seeds received a bye into the second round.

Draw

Finals

Top half

Bottom half

External links
 Official results archive (ITF)
 Official results archive (WTA)

Brighton International - Singles
Brighton International